Jeremy Francis John Bowen (born 6 February 1960) is a Welsh journalist and television presenter. 

He was the BBC's Middle East correspondent based in Jerusalem between 1995 and 2000 and the BBC Middle East editor from 2005 to 2022, before being appointed the International Editor of BBC News in August 2022.

Background
Jeremy Francis John Bowen was born on 6 February 1960 in Cardiff. He was educated at De La Salle School, Rumney, Cardiff High School, University College London (BA History) and the Paul H. Nitze School of Advanced International Studies at Johns Hopkins University in Washington, DC. His father Gareth reported on the 1966 Aberfan coal slurry disaster for the BBC, and became editor of news at Radio Wales.

Career
He joined the BBC in 1984 and has been a war correspondent for much of his career, starting with El Salvador in 1989. He has reported from more than 70 countries,  predominantly in the Middle East and in the Balkans. He reported from Bosnia-Herzegovina during the Bosnian War there, and from Kosovo during the 1999 conflict, during which he was robbed at gunpoint by bandits.

Bowen has been under fire on assignment a number of times. In what he was later to describe as the pivotal moment of his life, a colleague and friend was killed on 23 May 2000 in Lebanon. This took place while Bowen was covering the Israel Defense Forces' (IDF) pullout from Lebanon: Bowen's car came under tank fire from the IDF and his "fixer" and driver was killed.

Bowen and his cameraman escaped, but Bowen suffered post traumatic stress disorder and retreated from the frontline, moving to work in the studio as a presenter,  hosting the daily news and entertainment morning show Breakfast with Sophie Raworth between 2000 and 2002. He was also a guest host on the satirical panel game Have I Got News for You, and presented the BBC's 2001 three-part series Son of God, an investigation into the life of Jesus. He also presented Moses in 2002, a similar documentary that chronicled the life of Moses.

Given the chance to cover the 2003 invasion of Iraq from Baghdad, a city he knew well, he turned it down. Nonetheless, Bowen subsequently returned to the field in March 2003, as special correspondent, during which time he covered the death of Pope John Paul II. He became the BBC's first Middle East Editor when the position was created in June 2005 after the 2004 Balen Report on the BBC's coverage of the Israeli-Palestinian conflict to provide a broader perspective on wider Middle East issues and to add context to the reporting of events on the ground.

In 2005 he published the book Six Days: How the 1967 War Shaped the Middle East.

On 11 May 2008, Bowen and his camera operator again came under fire in Mount Lebanon. Nobody was injured and the incident was caught on camera.

In April 2009, the Editorial Standards Committee of the BBC Trust published a report into three complaints, including one by the Committee for Accuracy in Middle East Reporting in America, brought against two news items involving Bowen. The complaints included 24 allegations of breaching BBC guidelines on accuracy and impartiality of which three were fully or partially upheld.  The BBC Trust's censure was based on articles about Har Homa in the 1960s, how the Six-Day War affected the Middle East and an article on the aftermath of the aforementioned war. Although there was no finding of anti-Israel bias against Bowen, the BBC Trust said that he should have used clearer language and been more precise in some aspects of the piece. Also, on a claim that was found to be lacking in accuracy because it was not properly sourced, the committee accepted that Bowen had been provided with the information by an authoritative source. A website article was amended and Bowen did not face any disciplinary measures. Bowen voiced opposition to the censure, calling it a result of a "campaign group" whom he called "the enemies of impartiality".

In February 2011, Bowen became the first British journalist to interview Muammar Gaddafi since the start of the 2011 Libyan civil war against him and the government. As the conflict progressed at least two of Bowen's notebooks were either lost or stolen. One of these notebooks was subsequently found in the remains of a military convoy, which the rebel force that attacked it said contained Gaddafi's son, Khamis. The notebook contained both Bowen's words and a number of notes in Arabic detailing military manoeuvres and a list of persons to be detained.

On 5 July 2013, while reporting for the BBC on the protests in Egypt regarding the former president Morsi, he was shot in the head with shotgun pellets. He escaped without major injury and was taken away by his colleagues and bandaged up.

He was one of the few journalists inside Syria reporting on the civil war. In February 2015, he spoke with President Bashar al-Assad about the continuing Syrian conflict, during an exclusive BBC interview.

As of 2017, Bowen earns £150,000 – £199,999 as a BBC contributor and editor.

Since March 2022, Bowen has been reporting from on the ground in Ukraine during the Russo-Ukrainian War.

Personal life and interests
Bowen lives in Camberwell, South London with his partner Julia Williams, also a BBC journalist. They have a son and a daughter.

He is a supporter of Cardiff City Football Club.

On 1 April 2019, Bowen announced that he had undergone treatment to remove a tumour in his bowel.

Awards
 New York Television Festival 1995 - Best News Correspondent
 1993 Monte Carlo International TV Festival Silver Nymph for Bosnia war coverage
 RTS Best Breaking News Report 1996 - Best Breaking News report, for his coverage of the assassination of Israel's President Yitzhak Rabin
 Sony Gold award for News Story of the Year on the arrest of Saddam Hussein
 Part of the BBC teams that won a BAFTA for their Kosovo coverage.
 International Emmy 2006 for BBC News''', for its coverage, led by Bowen, of the 2006 Lebanon War
 2009 Prix Bayeux Calvados for war reporting (Gaza)
 2010 Charles Wheeler Award for achievements in broadcast journalism
 2012 Peace Through Media Award at the 8th annual International Media Awards in London.
 2012 Prix Bayeux Calvados for war reporting (Syria)
 2013 Peabody Award for reporting Syria's war
 2013 News and Documentary Emmy for Syria reporting
 2013 RTS Specialist Journalist of the Year
 2014 RTS Television Journalist of the Year
 2014 BAFTA Cymru Siân Phillips award 
 2015 James Cameron Memorial Award
 2015 Frontline Club Award for Yemen reporting 
 2016 RTS Interview of the Year for an interview with President Assad of Syria
 2016 Prix Bayeux Calvados for war reporting
 Fellow University College London 2005
 Honorary Fellow: Cardiff University, 2009; University of South Wales, 2013; Cardiff Metropolitan University, 2015; Aberystwyth University, 2015. 
 Honorary Doctor of Social Sciences Nottingham Trent University, 2014
 2021 nominee for a Peabody Award for his work as a writer and reporter on Afghanistan: Documenting A Crucial Year.

References

Bibliography
 Jeremy Bowen, Six Days - How the 1967 war shaped the Middle East (2003).  (pbk). History.
 Jeremy Bowen, War Stories (2006).  (hbk);  (pbk). Autobiography.
 Jeremy Bowen, The Arab Uprisings - The People Want the Fall of the Regime'' (2012).  (hbk)  (pbk)

External links
 
 Photograph. BBC.
 Newswatch: Jeremy Bowen. BBC.
 ''Bowen Middle East role 'enhanced'''. BBC.
 Hadar Sela, "Where did Jeremy Bowen learn the history of the Arab-Israeli conflict?" BBC Watch, December 27, 2012.

1960 births
Living people
Journalists from Cardiff
Alumni of University College London
Paul H. Nitze School of Advanced International Studies alumni
Welsh television journalists
Welsh war correspondents
BBC newsreaders and journalists
People associated with the History Department, University College London